The following is a list of the television networks and announcers who have broadcast college football's Gasparilla Bowl throughout the years.

The bowl has had several prior names, including St. Petersburg Bowl and Beef 'O' Brady's Bowl.

Television

Radio

References

External links

Gasparilla
Broadcasters
Gasparilla Bowl
Gasparilla Bowl